Kélo is a city in southwest Chad, its fifth largest city by population. It is also the capital of the department of Tandjilé Ouest.

Demographics

References

Populated places in Chad
Tandjilé Region